Stefan Leko (born June 3, 1974) is a German heavyweight kickboxer. He is the current WKA Super-Heavyweight world champion in kickboxing, and former Muay Thai world heavyweight champion and Kickboxing world super-heavyweight champion, WMTA, WKN, IKBO, IKBF, and WKA world champion, K-1 European Grand Prix 1998 champion, 1999 K-1 Dream champion and two time K-1 World Grand Prix in Las Vegas tournament champion. He fights out of Team Golden Glory in Breda, Netherlands under Cor Hemmers. Since 2011 Stefan Leko is coached and managed by Tom Trautsch and won two Heavyweight World Champion Titles.

Biography and career

Backstory and summary
Stefan Leko began karate at the age of 7. He was discovered by Klaus Waschkewitz of Masters Gym ten years later when he was 17. While being instructed by Waschkewitz, Leko won several World titles and four K-1 tournaments. His nickname "Blitz" means lightning in German. Stefan left Masters Gym in 2005 and currently belongs to the Team Golden Glory. Besides his kickboxing career Leko is also running a gym in Duisburg named Versus Gym.

He was the first person to beat Badr Hari in K-1 by first-round knockout, though it was later avenged by Hari. Leko holds notable wins over 3x K-1 World Grand Prix champion Remy Bonjasky, K-1 Heavyweight champion Badr Hari, world Muay Thai champion Mike Bernardo, 3x K-1 World Grand Prix champion Peter Aerts (x2), K-1 legend Ray Sefo, world Muay Thai champion Alexey Ignashov (x2), and K-1 Grand Prix finalist Francisco Filho.

Leko was successful in both Muay Thai/kickboxing and K-1 during the late 1990s and early 2000s, despite often conceding height and weight to some of the larger men in K-1. He won various K-1 tournaments and Muay Thai titles. His fortunes varied in the later stages of the 2000s, though he did win various more trophies and titles after his 2005 return to the kickboxing and Muay Thai world.

On 22nd of february 2020 Stefan Leko will make his appearance against Koos Wessels Boer, during 'Return of the legends' in Steenwijk (Holland).

Early success in K-1: European Grand Prix & Dream tournament champion

Leko first fought in K-1 in 1997, age 22. He won the K-1 European Grand Prix tournament in 1998, and after two losses to big names Andy Hug and Ray Sefo, he rebounded to win the K-1 Dream '99 tournament. By 2000, he had an 11–4 win–loss record in the world's premier stand-up fighting promotion, and was a 2x K-1 tournament champion.

Mixed fortunes in 2000–2002 - K-1 World Grand Prix USA title

A period of huge wins and bad losses followed. Over a three-year period, Leko would win the K-1 World Grand Prix 2001 in Las Vegas, and beat such champions as Remy Bonjasky and - stunningly - Peter Aerts, with a huge right cross that knocked the former 3x K-1 World Grand Prix champion out. In the same period, Leko also lost to Ernesto Hoost, Jorgen Kruth, Jerome LeBanner, Francisco Filho, and Mark Hunt.

The following year, Leko eradicated this inconsistency, and by the end of 2003 was considered to be in the top 5 ranked K-1 fighters.

Rise to the top in 2003 - exit from K-1, MMA debut with Pride

After a six-fight win streak in 2003 (5-0 in K-1) that included wins over multiple time K-1 champion Peter Aerts, heavyweight kickboxing champion Mike Bernardo, and K-1 World Grand Prix finalist Francisco Filho, the now top-ranked Leko was a favourite leading into the K-1 World Grand Prix 2003. With previous champion Ernesto Hoost out, Leko was considered a favourite leading in. However, he would leave K-1 prior to the finals, after contract negotiations broke down. Former Leko opponent Remy Bonjasky, whom Leko had beaten the previous year, would win the Grand Prix tournament.

Leko thus left the K-1 and kickboxing worlds, with a K-1 record of 23-11-1-1, and a total fight record of 50-12-1-1 (win/loss/draw/nc), and he decided to try his hand at another combat sport. He signed for Pride Fighting Championships, then the world's premier Mixed Martial Arts organisation. However, the striker was unable to find his place there, losing three successive fights to grapplers, and in 2005 he returned to the Muay Thai and kickboxing worlds.

Return to K-1 and kickboxing 

Leko returned to the stand-up fighting world in early 2005, becoming the WKN World Super-Heavyweight champion.

Prior to his hiatus from standup fighting, he had joined Team Golden Glory, a Dutch fight camp known for such fighters as Semmy Schilt, Alistair Overeem and Sergei Kharitonov. He made his return to top level kickboxing with Golden Glory for Dutch major league promotion It's Showtime, in 2005. He was booked in a grudge match with rising star Badr Hari.

Fighting at It's Showtime in Amsterdam, Leko beat Badr Hari by spinning back kick in a grudge fight. Leko finished him in round 1, via spinning back kick to the liver. The fight had lasted little more than 100 seconds, with Badr throwing Leko across the ring from a clinch. Leko got to his feet calmly, and after a teep, landed his trademark spin-kick and it finished the fight. Hari stayed down for several minutes after the fight was waved off.

A rematch was booked in K-1, and Hari returned the favour, winning via spectacular spinning back kick, the move noted for being Leko's trademark. This marks the duology as a fairly unusual rivalry, in that both men finished the other with the same move, a spinning back kick no less.

Last major success in K-1, later K-1 career

Leko's last major success to date came when he won his second K-1 World Grand Prix in Las Vegas tournament, beating Scott Lighty, Carter Williams and then Michael McDonald in the final. He won all three fights that night by KO.

He drew old foe Remy Bonjasky in the first round of the World Grand Prix finals5, and lost on points in a controversial fight in which Leko landed two shots to Bonjasky's groin. Leko claims these shots were unintentional; however, Remy took a considerable time out period during the fight, one that Leko had been performing well in to that point, and after which, Bonjasky managed to win a points decision from.

A rubber match with Bonjasky occurred in 2007, but by now it was clear Leko was passing his physical prime, and he lost in round 1, after Bonjasky landed his trademark flying knee. Golden Glory claimed the stoppage was too quick, but nevertheless, Leko was out of another World Grand Prix - his last appearance in the Final 16.

By early 2009 he was considered a fading force, despite going 4-1 the previous year, with two wins in K-1. However, he had not competed in the World Grand Prix 2008, and ended the year with a loss to Freddy Kemayo. Dropped out of almost every top 10 heavyweight rankings, Leko began to compete almost exclusively in the Netherlands and Germany, with varying results. He returned to fight for It's Showtime in May 2009, facing another smaller but popular big name heavyweight in Melvin Manhoef. On the back of two consecutive losses in K-1, Leko went into the fight as an underdog, but he ended up dominating Manhoef for two rounds, picking him apart with boxing and leg kicks. Unfortunately, in the final round he broke his foot, and the fight was called off. Manhoef magnanimously admitted that Leko had outclassed him, and offered a rematch to the Golden Glory fighter.

Despite this impressive display, Leko remained inconsistent, slipping into decline. He won his final K-1 fight to date in Sarajevo, and then lost twice in a row, in the Netherlands and Germany respectively.

2010

Leko strung together a three fight win streak, taking him to an overall K-1 and Muay Thai/kickboxing record of 64-22-1 win/loss/draw. After beating Volkan Duzgun on Fightingstars presents: It's Showtime 2010, Leko entered the Ultimate Glory heavyweight tournament, where he drew Wendell Roche in the quarter-finals. Halfway through round 2, Leko retired from the fight, with the reason given that he suffered "a dizzy spell", and lost his equilibrium. However, in the corner he seemed to be in considerable pain, and it emerged on Dutch fight forum mixfight.nl that Leko had a punctured lung.

In 2011, no bouts had been confirmed for Leko as of February 20, either by the fighter or Golden Glory. 
Mike Passenier, owner of Mike's Gym and trainer of fighters such as Badr Hari and Melvin Manhoef, stated in an interview with Daniel Fletcher on February 25, 2011 that Stefan Leko has retired.

Return to the ring

The retirement talk was officially put aside as Golden Glory confirmed that Leko would be returning to face old foe Jerome LeBanner on June 11, 2011, in Geneva. Leko was said to be serious about a return, and that the short-lived "retirement" was no longer relevant. He was even said to be intent on securing a rubber match with old foe Badr Hari, if he could string together some wins to get ranked and merit a final grudge encounter with the Moroccan.

WKA World title win

Leko won his first world title since 2005, when he beat Marinko Neimarević for the WKA World Super-Heavyweight kickboxing title by KO in round 2.

He was knocked out in round four by Nicolas Wamba at Fight Night Saint Tropez in Saint-Tropez, France on August 4, 2013.

He was scheduled to fight Dževad Poturak in Poturak's retirement fight at Final Fight Championship 7 in Sarajevo, Bosnia and Herzegovina on September 6, 2013. The fight however never materialized.

He competed in a four-man tournament at GFC Series 1 in Dubai, United Arab Emirates on May 29, 2014 and had his rubber match with Badr Hari in the semi-finals. He lost the bout by TKO after appearing lackluster and getting knocked down 3 times in the first round.

Leko suffered a twenty-one second high kick knockout loss at the hands of Zabit Samedov on the undercard of the Ruslan Chagaev vs. Fres Oquendo boxing match in Grozny, Russia on July 6, 2014.

Failed drug test

K-1 World Grand Prix 2003 in Basel
On May 30, 2003, Leko failed a drug test prior to K-1 World Grand Prix 2003 in Basel. He tested positive for elevated testosterone. The test indicated Leko's testosterone level was 5 times higher before his fight against Mike Bernardo.

Titles
K-1
 K-1 European Grand Prix 1998 champion
 K-1 Dream 1999 champion
 K-1 World Grand Prix in Las Vegas 2001 champion
 K-1 World Grand Prix in Las Vegas 2006 champion
 K-1 World Grand Prix 2001: 3rd place
International Kick Boxing Federation
 1996 IKBF Full Contact World Championship
 1997 IKBF Kickboxing Championship
World Muay Thai Association
 1997 WMTA Muay Thai World Championship
International Kick Boxing Organisation
 2000 International Kick Boxing Organisation Muay Thai World Championship
World Kickboxing Network
 2005 WKN Super Heavyweight Kickboxing World Championship
World Kickboxing Association
 2012 WKA Super Heavyweight Kickboxing World Championship

Kickboxing record

|-
|-  bgcolor="#FFBBBB"
| 2020-02-22 || Loss ||align=left| Koos Wessels || Battle Under the Tower|| Steenwijk, Netherlands || TKO (referee stoppage) || 1 || N/A
|-
! style=background:white colspan=9 |
|-
|-  bgcolor="#FFBBBB"
| 2019-11-30 || Loss ||align=left| Niko Lohmann || KOK World Series || Krefeld, Germany || TKO (right hook) || 1 || N/A
|-
! style=background:white colspan=9 |
|-
|-  bgcolor="#FFBBBB"
| 2016-06-18 || Loss ||align=left| Petar Majstorović || Swiss Las Vegas Fusion 2016 || Switzerland || TKO || 2 || N/A

|-
|-  bgcolor="#fbb"
| 2015-05-30 || Loss||align=left| Martin Pacas || Full Fight || Banská Bystrica, Slovakia || TKO (Punches) || 1 || N/A
|-

|-
|-  bgcolor="#FFBBBB"
| 2014-07-06 || Loss ||align=left| Zabit Samedov || Chagaev vs. Oquendo || Grozny, Russia || KO (left high kick) || 1 || 0:21
|-
|-  bgcolor="#FFBBBB"
| 2014-05-29 || Loss ||align=left| Badr Hari || GFC Fight Series 1 - Heavyweight Tournament, Semi Finals || Dubai, UAE || KO (right cross) || 1 || 1:38
|-
|-  bgcolor="#FFBBBB"
| 2014-03-07 || Loss ||align=left| Mert Akin || AKIN Dövüş Arenası KickBoxing Event || Turkey || TKO || 2 || N/A
|-  bgcolor="#FFBBBB"
| 2013-08-04 || Loss ||align=left| Nicolas Wamba || Fight Night Saint-Tropez || Saint-Tropez, France || KO (high kick) || 4 || N/A 
|-
|-  bgcolor="#FFBBBB"
| 2013-06-14 || Loss ||align=left| Ondřej Hutník || Time of Gladiator || Brno, Czech Republic || KO (round kick) || 2 || N/A
|-
! style=background:white colspan=9 |
|-
|-  bgcolor="#FFBBBB"
| 2013-04-14 || Loss ||align=left| Damian Garcia || K-1 MNL Mallorca || Mallorca, Spain || Decision || 3 || 3:00
|-  bgcolor="#CCFCC"
| 2012-03-17 || Win ||align=left| Marinko Neimarević || WKA World Championships || Kassel, Germany || KO (right hook) || 2 || N/A 
|-
! style=background:white colspan=9 |
|-
|-  bgcolor="#FFBBBB"
| 2011-11-23 || Loss ||align=left| Makoto Uehara || RISE 85: Heavyweight Tournament 2011, Quarter Finals || Tokyo, Japan || Decision (unanimous) || 3 || 3:00
|-  bgcolor="#FFBBBB"
| 2011-11-17 || Loss ||align=left| Errol Zimmerman || SUPERKOMBAT Fight Club, Semi Finals || Oradea, Romania || TKO (referee stoppage) || 1 || 0:58
|-  bgcolor="#CCFCC"
| 2011-11-17 || Win ||align=left| Tsotne Rogava || SUPERKOMBAT Fight Club, Quarter Finals || Oradea, Romania || Ext. R Decision (split) || 4 || 3:00
|-  bgcolor="#FFBBBB"
| 2011-10-01 || Loss ||align=left| Sebastien van Thielen || SUPERKOMBAT World Grand Prix III 2011, Semi Finals || Brăila, Romania || Ext. R Decision (unanimous) || 4 || 3:00
|-  bgcolor="#FFBBBB"
| 2011-07-16 || Loss ||align=left| Cătălin Moroşanu || SUPERKOMBAT World Grand Prix II 2011 || Constanța, Romania || Decision (unanimous) || 3 || 3:00
|-  bgcolor="#FFBBBB"
| 2011-06-11 || Loss ||align=left| Jérôme Le Banner || 8ème Nuit des Sports de Combat || Geneva, Switzerland || Decision (unanimous) || 5 || 2:00
|-
! style=background:white colspan=9 |
|-
|-  bgcolor="#FFBBBB"
| 2010-11-27 || Loss ||align=left| Frédéric Sinistra || La Nuit du Kick-Boxing 2010 || Liège, Belgium || TKO (doctor stoppage) || N/A || N/A
|-  bgcolor="#CCFFCC"
|-  bgcolor="#FFBBBB"
| 2010-10-16 || Loss ||align=left| Wendell Roche || United Glory 12: 2010-2011 World Series Quarter Finals || Amsterdam, Netherlands || TKO (retirement) || 2 || 1:44 
|-  bgcolor="#CCFFCC"
| 2010-09-12 || Win ||align=left| Volkan Düzgün || Fightingstars presents: It's Showtime 2010 ||Amsterdam, Netherlands || Decision || 3 || 3:00
|-  bgcolor="#CCFFCC"
| 2010-05-01 || Win ||align=left| Nikolaj Falin || Cologne Fight Night 2010 || Cologne, Germany || Decision (unanimous) || 3 || 3:00
|-  bgcolor="#CCFFCC"
| 2010-03-20 || Win ||align=left| Moussa Sissoko || Kickboxing Superstar XIX Edition || Milan, Italy || TKO || 3 || N/A
|-  bgcolor="#FFBBBB"
| 2009-11-15 || Loss ||align=left| Karl Glyschinsky || German King Cup || Germany || Decision || 3 || 3:00
|-  bgcolor="#FFBBBB"
| 2009-10-17 || Loss ||align=left| Anderson Silva || Ultimate Glory 11: A Decade of Fights || Amsterdam, Netherlands || KO (punches) || 2 || N/A
|-  bgcolor="#CCFFCC"
| 2009-07-03 || Win ||align=left| Sanid Imamovic || K-1 ColliZion 2009 Sarajevo || Sarajevo, Bosnia and Herzegovina || TKO (corner stoppage) || 2 || 3:00
|-  bgcolor="#FFBBBB"
| 2009-05-16 || Loss ||align=left| Melvin Manhoef || It's Showtime 2009 Amsterdam || Amsterdam, Netherlands || TKO (leg injury) || 3 || N/A
|-  bgcolor="#FFBBBB"
| 2009-03-21 || Loss ||align=left| Raul Cătinaș || K-1 ColliZion 2009 Croatia || Split, Croatia || KO (left hook) || 1 || 2:35
|-  bgcolor="#FFBBBB"
| 2008-12-20 || Loss ||align=left| Freddy Kemayo || K-1 Fighting Network Prague 2008 || Prague, Czech Republic || Ext. R Decision (unanimous) || 4 || 3:00
|-  bgcolor="#CCFFCC"
| 2008-11-22 || Win ||align=left| Daniel Sołtysiak || K-1 World Grand Prix 2008 in Riga || Riga, Latvia || Decision (unanimous) || 3 || 3:00
|-  bgcolor="#CCFFCC"
| 2008-11-09 || Win ||align=left| Rodney Glunder || Ultimate Glory 10 "The Battle of Arnhem" || Arnhem, Netherlands || Decision (unanimous) || 3 || 3:00
|-  bgcolor="#CCFFCC"
| 2008-08-09 || Win ||align=left| Junior Sua || K-1 World Grand Prix 2008 in Hawaii || Honolulu, Hawaii || KO (knee strike) || 1 || 2:36
|-  bgcolor="#CCFFCC"
| 2008-01-12 || Win ||align=left| Michel Andrade || Lord of the Ring || Belgrade, Serbia || KO (left body shot)|| 2 || 0:40
|-  bgcolor="#CCFFCC"
| 2007-10-14 || Win ||align=left| Bahadir Sari || Kickboks Gala Istanbul || Istanbul, Turkey || Decision (unanimous) || 3 || 3:00
|-  bgcolor="#FFBBBB"
| 2007-09-27 || Loss ||align=left| Remy Bonjasky || K-1 World GP 2007 in Seoul Final 16 || Seoul, Korea || TKO (referee stoppage)|| 1 || 2:50
|-  bgcolor="#CCFFCC"
| 2007-08-11 || Win ||align=left| Mighty Mo || K-1 World Grand Prix 2007 in Las Vegas || Las Vegas, Nevada || Decision (unanimous) || 3 || 3:00
|-  bgcolor="#CCFFCC"
| 2007-05-04 || Win ||align=left| Cătălin Moroşanu || K-1 Fighting Network Romania 2007 || Bucharest, Romania || Decision (unanimous) || 3 || 3:00
|-  bgcolor="#FFBBBB"
| 2007-03-10 || Loss ||align=left| Magomed Magomedov || K-1 Fighting Network Croatia 2007 || Split, Croatia || Ext. R Decision (unanimous) || 4 || 3:00
|-  bgcolor="#FFBBBB"
| 2006-12-02 || Loss ||align=left| Remy Bonjasky || K-1 World Grand Prix 2006 || Tokyo, Japan || Decision (unanimous) || 3 || 3:00
|-  bgcolor="#CCFFCC"
| 2006-09-30 || Win ||align=left| Ray Sefo || K-1 World Grand Prix 2006 in Osaka Opening Round || Osaka, Japan || Ext. R Decision (unanimous) || 4 || 3:00
|-  bgcolor="#CCFFCC"
| 2006-08-12 || Win ||align=left| Michael McDonald || K-1 World Grand Prix 2006 in Las Vegas II || Las Vegas, Nevada || TKO (referee stoppage) || 2 || 2:28
|-
! style=background:white colspan=9 |
|-
|-  bgcolor="#CCFFCC"
| 2006-08-12 || Win ||align=left| Carter Williams || K-1 World Grand Prix 2006 in Las Vegas II || Las Vegas, Nevada || KO (right spinning liver kick) || 1 || 2:40
|-  bgcolor="#CCFFCC"
| 2006-08-12 || Win ||align=left| Scott Lighty || K-1 World Grand Prix 2006 in Las Vegas II || Las Vegas, Nevada || TKO (referee stoppage) || 3 || 0:58
|-  bgcolor="#FFBBBB"
| 2006-04-29 || Loss ||align=left| Ruslan Karaev || K-1 World Grand Prix 2006 in Las Vegas || Las Vegas, Nevada || Decision (unanimous)|| 3 || 3:00
|-  bgcolor="#FFBBBB"
| 2005-11-19 || Loss ||align=left| Badr Hari || K-1 World Grand Prix 2005 || Tokyo, Japan || KO (spinning back left high kick) || 2 || 1:30
|-  bgcolor="#CCFFCC"
| 2005-06-12 || Win ||align=left| Badr Hari || It's Showtime 2005 Amsterdam || Amsterdam, Netherlands || KO (spinning back mid kick) || 1 || 1:44
|-  bgcolor="#CCFFCC"
| 2005-05-14 || Win ||align=left| Florian Ogunade || Local Kombat 14 "Lupta capitală" || Bucharest, Romania || TKO (referee stoppage) || 3 || N/A 
|-
! style=background:white colspan=9 |
|-
|-  bgcolor="#CCFFCC"
| 2003-12-31 || Win ||align=left| Kazunari Murakami || Inoki Bom-Ba-Ye 2003 || Kobe, Japan || KO (right high kick) || 1 || 1:08
|-  bgcolor="#CCFFCC"
| 2003-10-31 || Win ||align=left| Sebastiaan van de Muysenberg || K-1 Final Fight Stars War in Zagreb || Zagreb, Croatia || KO (punches) || 2 || N/A
|-  bgcolor="#CCFFCC"
| 2003-10-11 || Win ||align=left| Francisco Filho || K-1 World Grand Prix 2003 Final Elimination || Osaka, Japan || Decision (unanimous) || 3 || 3:00
|-  bgcolor="#CCFFCC"
| 2003-05-30 || Win ||align=left| Mike Bernardo || K-1 World Grand Prix 2003 in Basel || Basel, Switzerland || Decision (unanimous) || 5 || 3:00
|-  bgcolor="#CCFFCC"
| 2003-05-02 || Win ||align=left| Great Kusatsu || K-1 World Grand Prix 2003 in Las Vegas || Las Vegas, Nevada, United States || TKO || 2 || 2:24
|-  bgcolor="#CCFFCC"
| 2003-03-30 || Win ||align=left| Peter Aerts || K-1 World Grand Prix 2003 in Saitama || Saitama, Japan || TKO (doctor stoppage) || 3 || 1:44
|-  bgcolor="#FFBBBB"
| 2002-12-07 || Loss ||align=left| Mark Hunt || K-1 World Grand Prix 2002 Final || Tokyo, Japan || KO (left hook) || 3 || 1:16
|-  bgcolor="#CCFFCC"
| 2002-10-05 || Win ||align=left| Alexey Ignashov || K-1 World Grand Prix 2002 Final Elimination || Saitama, Japan || Ext. R Decision (unanimous) || 4 || 3:00
|-  bgcolor="#CCFFCC"
| 2002-08-17 || Win ||align=left| Remy Bonjasky || K-1 World Grand Prix 2002 in Las Vegas || Las Vegas, Nevada || Decision (unanimous) || 3 || 3:00
|-  bgcolor="#FFBBBB"
| 2002-05-25 || Loss ||align=left| Ernesto Hoost || K-1 World Grand Prix 2002 in Paris || Paris, France || KO (punches) || 1 || 1:48
|-  bgcolor="#FFBBBB"
| 2001-12-08 || Loss ||align=left| Mark Hunt || K-1 World Grand Prix 2001 Final || Tokyo, Japan || Decision (unanimous) || 3 || 3:00
|-  bgcolor="#FFBBBB"
| 2001-12-08 || Loss ||align=left| Ernesto Hoost || K-1 World Grand Prix 2001 Final || Tokyo, Japan || Decision (unanimous) || 3 || 3:00
|-
! style=background:white colspan=9 |
|-
|-  bgcolor="#CCFFCC"
| 2001-08-11 || Win ||align=left| Peter Aerts || K-1 World Grand Prix 2001 in Las Vegas || Las Vegas, Nevada || KO (right cross) || 3 || 2:05
|-
! style=background:white colspan=9 |
|-
|-  bgcolor="#CCFFCC"
| 2001-08-11 || Win ||align=left| Sergei Ivanovich || K-1 World Grand Prix 2001 in Las Vegas || Las Vegas, Nevada || TKO (corner stoppage) || 3 || 3:00
|-  bgcolor="#CCFFCC"
| 2001-08-11 || Win ||align=left| Jeff Roufus || K-1 World Grand Prix 2001 in Las Vegas || Las Vegas, Nevada || TKO || 2 || 2:34
|-  bgcolor="#FFBBBB"
| 2001-06-24 || Loss ||align=left| Jérôme Le Banner || K-1 Survival 2001 || Sendai, Japan || Decision (unanimous) || 5 || 3:00
|-  bgcolor="#c5d2ea"
| 2001-05-20 || NC ||align=left| Marc de Wit || K-1 Germany Grand Prix 2001 || Oberhausen, Germany || NC (de Wit suffers leg injury) || 1 || N/A
|-  bgcolor="#FFBBBB"
| 2001-03-17 || Loss ||align=left| Jörgen Kruth || K-1 Gladiators 2001 || Yokohama, Japan || KO (right hook) || 2 || 2:19
|-  bgcolor="#CCFFCC"
| 2001-02-04 || Win ||align=left| Alexey Ignashov || K-1 Holland GP 2001 in Arnhem || Arnhem, Netherlands || DQ || 5 || 3:00
|-  bgcolor="#FFBBBB"
| 2000-12-10 || Loss ||align=left| Francisco Filho || K-1 World Grand Prix 2000 || Tokyo, Japan || Ext. R Decision (unanimous) || 4 || 3:00
|-  bgcolor="#CCFFCC"
| 2000-10-09 || Win ||align=left| Andrew Thomson || K-1 World Grand Prix 2000 in Fukuoka || Fukuoka, Japan || KO (right low kick) || 2 || 1:50
|-  bgcolor="#CCFFCC"
| 2000-09-03 || Win ||align=left| Andrei Zuravkov || Battle of Arnhem II || Arnhem, Netherlands || KO || 2 || N/A
|-
! style=background:white colspan=9 |
|-
|-  bgcolor="#CCFFCC"
| 2000-06-03 || Win ||align=left| Ricky Nicholson || K-1 Fight Night 2000 || Zurich, Switzerland || Decision (unanimous) || 5 || 3:00
|-  bgcolor="#CCFFCC"
| 2000-04-23 || Win ||align=left| Xhavit Bajrami || K-1 The Millennium || Osaka, Japan || Decision (majority) || 3 || 3:00
|-  bgcolor="#CCFFCC"
| 1999-12-05 || Win ||align=left| Harry Hooft || K-1 World Grand Prix 1999 || Tokyo, Japan || KO (right back kick) || 1 || 2:37
|-  bgcolor="#FFBBBB"
| 1999-10-05 || Loss ||align=left| Sam Greco || K-1 World Grand Prix '99 Opening Round || Osaka, Japan || Decision (majority) || 3 || 2:35
|-
! style=background:white colspan=9 |
|-
|-  bgcolor="#CCFFCC"
| 1999-07-18 || Win ||align=left| Samir Benazzouz || K-1 Dream '99 Final || Nagoya, Japan || KO (right low kick) || 1 || 2:45
|-
! style=background:white colspan=9 |
|-
|-  bgcolor="#CCFFCC"
| 1999-07-18 || Win ||align=left| Cyril Abidi || K-1 Dream '99 Semi Finals || Nagoya, Japan || Decision (unanimous) || 3 || 3:00
|-  bgcolor="#CCFFCC"
| 1999-07-18 || Win ||align=left| Philippe Gomis || K-1 Dream '99 Quarter Finals || Nagoya, Japan || KO (right cross) || 1 || 2:56
|-  bgcolor="#FFBBBB"
| 1999-06-05 || Loss ||align=left| Andy Hug || K-1 Fight Night '99 || Zurich, Switzerland || Decision (unanimous) || 5 || 3:00
|-
! style=background:white colspan=9 |
|-
|-  bgcolor="#FFBBBB"
| 1998-09-27 || Loss ||align=left| Ray Sefo || K-1 World Grand Prix '98 Opening Round || Osaka, Japan || Decision (unanimous) || 5 || 3:00
|-
! style=background:white colspan=9 |
|-
|-  bgcolor="#CCFFCC"
| 1998-07-18 || Win ||align=left| Nicholas Pettas || K-1 Dream '98 || Nagoya, Japan || KO (punch) || 2 || 1:09
|-  bgcolor="#CCFFCC"
| 1998-06-06 || Win ||align=left| Rob Van Esdonk || K-1 Fight Night '98 Final || Zurich, Switzerland || KO (punch) || 3 || 1:57
|-
! style=background:white colspan=9 |
|-
|-  bgcolor="#CCFFCC"
| 1998-06-06 || Win ||align=left| Ray Hoffman || K-1 Fight Night '98 Semi Finals || Zurich, Switzerland || KO (punch) || 2 || 2:07
|-  bgcolor="#CCFFCC"
| 1998-06-06 || Win ||align=left| Petar Majstorovic || K-1 Fight Night '98 Quarter Finals || Zurich, Switzerland || Ext. R Decision (unanimous) || 4 || 3:00
|-  bgcolor="#CCFFCC"
| 1998-03-08 || Win ||align=left| Cengiz Koc || Night of the Masters || Duisburg, Germany || TKO (corner stoppage) || 4 || 3:00
|-  bgcolor="#FFBBBB"
| 1997-09-07 || Loss ||align=left| Ernesto Hoost || K-1 Grand Prix '97 1st Round || Osaka, Japan || KO (right cross) || 2 || 0:34
|-
! style=background:white colspan=9 |
|-
|-  bgcolor="#CCFFCC"
| 1997-04-29 || Win ||align=left| Sadau Kiatsongrit || K-1 Braves '97 || Fukuoka, Japan || Decision (unanimous) || 5 || 3:00
|-  bgcolor="#FFBBBB"
| 1996-03-16 || Loss ||align=left| Jan Lomulder || Thai/Kickboxing Nijmegen || Nijmegen, Netherlands || Decision || 5 || 3:00
|-
| colspan=9 | Legend:

Mixed martial arts record

| Loss 
|align=center| 0–3
|Kazuhiro Nakamura 
| Pride 29 
| TKO (punches) 
|  
|align=center| 1 
|align=center| 0:54
| Saitama, Japan 
|
|- 
| Loss 
|align=center| 0–2
| Ikuhisa Minowa 
| Pride Shockwave 2004 
| Submission (heel hook) 
|  
|align=center| 1 
|align=center| 0:27
| Saitama, Japan
|
|- 
| Loss 
|align=center| 0–1
| Naoya Ogawa 
| Pride Total Elimination 2004 
| Submission (arm-triangle choke) 
|  
|align=center| 1 
|align=center| 1:34
| Saitama, Japan 
|

See also
List of K-1 events
List of K-1 champions
List of male kickboxers

References

External links

Profile at K-1
Golden Glory Official Site

1974 births
Living people
German male kickboxers
Croatian male kickboxers
Heavyweight kickboxers
German male mixed martial artists
Croatian male mixed martial artists
Light heavyweight mixed martial artists
Mixed martial artists utilizing Muay Thai
German Muay Thai practitioners
Croatian Muay Thai practitioners
Mixed martial artists utilizing Kyokushin kaikan
German people of Croatian descent
Croats of Bosnia and Herzegovina
Croatian emigrants to Germany
Sportspeople from Duisburg
Sportspeople from Mostar
German male karateka
SUPERKOMBAT kickboxers
Doping cases in kickboxing